Imbibe is a magazine published in Portland, Oregon, United States. It is published six times a year. The magazine covers beverages of all kinds, including spirits, wine, beer, coffee, and tea.

History 
The first issue of Imbibe was released in 2005.

Awards and mentions 
The Sacramento Bee has called Imbibe "a leading magazine of cocktail culture". The magazine also received a Tales of the Cocktail Spirited Award: Best Cocktail Writing in 2014, a James Beard Foundation Award in 2012, the Michael Jackson Beer Journalism Award in 2008, the Maggie Awards for Best Special Interest Magazine in 2007 and 2008, and the Eddie Award for Best Epicurean Magazine in 2007.

References

External links
 

2005 establishments in Oregon
Bimonthly magazines published in the United States
Lifestyle magazines published in the United States
Food and drink magazines
Magazines established in 2005
Magazines published in Portland, Oregon